Margarettidae is a family of bryozoans belonging to the order Cheilostomatida.

Genera:
 Margaretta Gray, 1843
 Tubucella Canu & Bassler, 1917

References

Cheilostomatida